Morgann Leleux Romero (born November 14, 1992) is an American track and field athlete who specialises in the pole vault. In 2021, she competed at the 2020 Olympic Games in Tokyo where she advanced to the finals.

Personal life

Leleux is originally from New Iberia, Louisiana. She has been married to Jacob Romero since December 2016.

Career

Leleux was an All-American at the University of Georgia and 2016 All-American at the University of Louisiana.

On 26 June 2021, at the U.S. Olympic Trials at Hayward Field in Eugene, Oregon, Leleux finished second with a height of 4.70m behind winner Katie Nageotte, to secure a spot on the American team for the delayed 2020 Summer Olympics.

References 

Living people
1992 births
American female pole vaulters
Track and field athletes from Louisiana
People from New Iberia, Louisiana
Georgia Lady Bulldogs track and field athletes
Louisiana Ragin' Cajuns athletes
Athletes (track and field) at the 2020 Summer Olympics
Olympic track and field athletes of the United States